Andy Pandy is a British children's television series that aired on BBC Television in 1950. Originally live, a series of 26 filmed programmes was shown until 1970, when a new series of 13 episodes was made. This series was based upon a comic strip of the same name (made in the style of children's magazines Robin and Pippin).

The series was followed by a revival with 26 episodes (52 segments) in 2002. In total, 92 episodes were produced.

Original 1950 and 1970 versions
The original version of Andy Pandy premiered on BBC TV in 1950, on either 11 July or 20 June, as part of the For the Children strand (later Watch with Mother) narrated by Maria Bird who also narrated the black & white 1950s original broadcasts of Flower Pot Men, The Woodentops and Bizzy Lizzie.  Initially it was broadcast live, but it was realised that if the programmes were filmed, they could be repeated. 26 fifteen-minute episodes were filmed on 16mm around 1952 and repeated continuously until 1969. In 1970, 13 new episodes were made in colour with Vera McKechnie as narrator.

A marionette who lived in a picnic basket, Andy was later joined by Teddy, a teddy bear, and Looby Loo, a rag doll, who came to life when Andy and Teddy were not around. Looby Loo sang Here we go Looby Loo. All three lived in the same picnic basket. Each episode ended with a variation on the song: "Time to go home / Time to go home / Andy is waving goodbye."

It is claimed that the character's design was based on Paul Atterbury, the then young son of puppeteer Audrey Atterbury. A comic-strip version was published in Robin.

The production staff for the original series were:
 Producer: Freda Lingstrom.
 Narrator:  Maria Bird and later in the 1970 remakes Vera McKechnie.
 Writer/composer: Freda Lingstrom and Maria Bird.
 Singers: Gladys Whitred, Julia Williams [voiced the 'Little Weed'] and Maria Bird (in the 1970 colour series).
 Puppeteers: Audrey Atterbury, Molly Gibson, Martin Grainger, The Stavordales and Christopher Leith (in the 1970 colour series).

Episode list
The 26 episodes were:

 "Tea Party" (20 June 1950)
 "Presents" (27 June 1950)
 "Music" (4 July 1950)
 "Hand Bells" (11 July 1950)
 "ABC" (18 July 1950)
 "Bricks" (25 July 1950)
 "Playing School" (1 August 1950)
 "Play Shops" (8 August 1950)
 "Leaning House" (15 August 1950)
 "Pram" (22 August 1950)
 "Farm" (29 August 1950)
 "Garden" (5 September 1950)
 "Wall and Tortoise" (12 September 1950)
 "Turtles" (19 September 1950)
 "Boats" (26 September 1950)
 "Paddling Pool" (3 October 1950)
 "Horse and Fish" (10 October 1950)
 "Bird and Butterfly" (17 October 1950)
 "Rabbits" (24 October 1950)
 "Kittens" (31 October 1950)
 "Kings and Queens" (7 November 1950)
 "Jack in the Box" (14 November 1950)
 "The Cart" (21 November 1950)
 "Swing" (28 November 1950)
 ? (5 December 1950)
 ? (12 December 1950)

1970 series
By 1970, as BBC1 was by then transmitted in colour, 13 new episodes were produced and shown from 5  January 1970.

The 13 episodes are:

 "Andy Pandy's House" (5 January 1970)
 "Hobby Horses" (12 January 1970)
 "Scooters" (19 January 1970)
 "Trampoline" (26 January 1970)
 "Jack-in-the-Box" (2 February 1970)
 "A Wall and a Hedgehog" (9 February 1970)
 "Cleaning the House" (16 February 1970)
 "Tricycle" (23 February 1970)
 "Looby Loo Has a Cold" (2 March 1970)
 "The Jeep" (9 March 1970)
 "Tea Party" (16 March 1970)
 "Red Engine" (23 March 1970)
 "Sailing Boats" (30 March 1970)

The series was parodied by Des O'Connor in his Dandy Sandy sketches with Harry Secombe and Britt Eckland.

2002 revival

In 2002, BBC produced a revival of 52 episodes with the use of stop-motion animation instead of string puppets: the original nursery and garden were expanded to an entire village, with Andy, Teddy and Looby Loo now owning individual houses, as well as four new characters that were introduced in the series: Missy Hissy (and Missy Hissy’s brother, another snake who is never seen); Tiffo, a teal-and-purple dog; Bilbo (vocals performed by David Holt), a sailor; and Orbie (vocals performed by Maria Darling), a yellow-and-blue ball. Tom Conti narrated the new series.

Though the emphasis of the original series was on music and movement, the emphasis of the 2002 series was on making and doing. The series was animated and produced by Cosgrove Hall Films and Ben Productions (the latter also producing the 2001 remake of Bill and Ben aka Flower Pot Men).

This is a list of episodes in each series with songs every two episodes (if any):

Series 1

Series 2

UK VHS and DVD releases

References

External links
 
2002 animated version @ BBC Programmes
British Film Institute Screen Online
IMDB

1950 British television series debuts
1957 British television series endings
1970 British television series debuts
1970 British television series endings
2002 British television series debuts
2002 British television series endings
1950s British children's television series
1970s British children's television series
2000s British children's television series
BBC children's television shows
Television series by BBC Studios
Television series by Cosgrove Hall Films
British children's animated television shows
British preschool education television series
British stop-motion animated television series
British television shows featuring puppetry
1950s preschool education television series
1960s preschool education television series
1970s preschool education television series
English-language television shows
CBeebies
British television series revived after cancellation